During the 2005–06 season Cardiff City played in the Football League Championship. It was the club's third year in the Championship since being promoted from League One.

Season review

Kit
Cardiff ended a 3-year deal with Puma and changed to Spanish company Joma. Housing firm Redrow continued as the main shirt sponsor.

League

Cardiff began their season with 1–0 loss to Ipswich Town but bounced back with a win at Leeds United before going four games without a win, breaking the streak with consecutive wins over Leicester City and Crystal Palace. On 22 October Cardiff recorded their biggest win of the season with a 6–1 victory over Crewe Alexandra but this was followed by two draws and a loss and by Christmas the sides form had seen them win just three out of thirteen games since the end of October.

The new year saw a continuation of Cardiff's poor form with a 5–1 defeat against Reading. Six wins from the final eighteen games of the season left Cardiff with a 12th-place finish.

League Cup

Cardiff entered in round one, beating Colchester United 2–0 at the Colchester Community Stadium. They claimed a victory in the second round over Macclesfield Town before being eliminated by Leicester City in the third round.

FA Cup

Cardiff were drawn against Premier League side Arsenal after entering the competition in the third round, suffering a 2–1 defeat at the Arsenal Stadium on 7 January.

Squad statistics

|}

Transfers

Summer transfers in

Summer transfers out
 * Indicates player joined club after being released by Cardiff

Loans in

Loans out

January transfers in

January transfers out

Standings

Results by round

Fixtures and results

Championship

League Cup

FA Cup

FAW Premier Cup

References

See also

 Cardiff City F.C. seasons
 2005–06 in English football

Cardiff City F.C. seasons
Welsh football clubs 2005–06 season
Cardiff City